Engen was a Japanese era from 1336 to 1340. Engen may also refer to
Engen (surname)
Engen, Germany, a town in Baden-Württemberg, Germany
Engen station
Battle of Engen between France and the Habsburg Monarchy in 1800
Engen Petroleum, a South African oil company
Engen Botswana Limited, a Botswana petroleum company